Olszanka  is a village in the administrative district of Gmina Nowinka, within Augustów County, Podlaskie Voivodeship, in north-eastern Poland.

Notable people
 Witold Urbanowicz, Polish fighter ace of World War II

References

Villages in Augustów County
Suwałki Governorate
Białystok Voivodeship (1919–1939)